Mudon is a town in the Mon State of south-east Myanmar,  south of Mawlamyine. Mudon lies along the highway that links Mawlamyine to Thanbyuzayat, Kyaik-kami (Amherst) and Setse Beach.

Etymology
"Mudon" derives from the Mon language term "Mudeung", which means "salty peak."

Attractions 

The Win Sein reclining Buddha, the world's largest reclining Buddha, is a major attraction in Mudon. The Win Sein reclining Buddha is approached by a roadway with 500 life-size statues of Arahant disciples of Buddha. Inside there are numerous rooms with dioramas of the teachings of Buddhism, similar to Haw Par Villa of Singapore. As of 2020 a 2nd reclining Buddha of comparable size to Win Sein Taw Ya is under construction.

Other attraction sites are Kangyi Pagoda, Kangyi Lake, Jon Jon Ja Forest Monastery, Mon culture at Kamawet village and the Kyauktalon Taung and Yadana Taung limestone formations.

Tradition 
Local women are famous for weaving red-checked pattern Mon traditional longyis at traditional wooden loom.

Gallery

References

External links
 "Mudon Map — Satellite Images of Mudon" Maplandia World Gazetteer

Township capitals of Myanmar
Populated places in Mon State